Kasper Jensen (born May 28, 1987) is a Danish ice hockey defenceman who plays for Aalborg Pirates of the Danish AL-Bank Ligaen. He has represented Denmark at two World Championships in 2011 and 2012.

Jensen signed with Tingsryd for the 2012–13 Hockey Allsvenskan season, but played just six games before he was released from his contract by mutual consent.

External links

1987 births
Aalborg Pirates players
Danish ice hockey defencemen
Herlev Hornets players
Living people
Rødovre Mighty Bulls players